Minecraft Dungeons is a dungeon crawler video game developed by Mojang Studios and Double Eleven and published by Xbox Game Studios. It is a spin-off of the sandbox video game Minecraft and was released for Microsoft Windows, Nintendo Switch, PlayStation 4 and Xbox One in May 2020, and for Xbox Series X/S in February 2021. It was also adapted into an arcade game by Raw Thrills.

Minecraft Dungeons received mixed reviews, with most critics deeming the game fun and charming, and praising its visuals and music. However, its simple gameplay and use of procedural generation were met with a more mixed reception, with its short story and lack of depth criticized.

Gameplay
Unlike Minecraft, Minecraft Dungeons does not feature an open world nor mining or building. Instead, it is a point-and-click hack and slash-styled dungeon crawler, rendered from an isometric perspective. Players explore procedurally generated and hand crafted dungeons filled with randomly-generated monsters and also deal with traps, puzzles, bosses and finding treasure. There is no class system; players can use any weapon or armor they wish. The game includes a four-player local and online multiplayer.

Items 
Players can obtain items from various places within the game, each being different, And it is recommended to go into higher difficulties to get better items.

Enchantments 
Players can earn Levels by doing in-game activities to make their tools have certain abilities called Enchantments. These make the tools better for killing monsters within the game, and good enchantment combos can bring a player through the hardest difficult situations or quests.

Artifacts & Souls 
Artifacts are special items with a cooldown, that buff the player or does damage to monsters around the player. Some artifacts use Souls to activate instead of longer cooldowns (Soul abilities have a small cooldown). Souls are obtained after a monster is defeated. Enchantments and armor can increase soul output and allow players to use soul abilities more frequently. Like enchantments, having good artifact combos can make the difference between passing and failing the quest.

Item Ranking 
Item cooldowns, armor health gain, and weapon damage are managed with a "Power" level. The higher the power level, the better the tool or item. Weapon damage are armor health gain increase exponentially, but artifact cooldown reduction seems to be linear or a decaying exponential function. Players can access higher power level items by going on quests are the same or greater than their "Power Level", which is their average power among the items equipped.

Also, items can have rarities like Common, Rare, and Unique. Rare gives minimal to satisfactory benefits, but Unique adds an extra ability to the item that makes it the target item for late-game players.

A "Gilded" Item is a free enchantment added to the item. It is rarer and finding them is more common in mid to late-game areas.

Plot 
Minecraft Dungeons is set in the same fictional world as Minecraft, known as the "Overworld", consisting of rough 3D objects—mainly cubes and fluids, and commonly called "blocks"—representing various materials, and inhabited by both peaceful and hostile mobs. Unlike Minecraft, the game features a linear, story-driven campaign, and cutscenes.

The opening cutscene tells the story of an Illager named Archie, who was driven away by his people. While searching for a new home, he was forced to leave every village he found due to Villagers not allowing him to live with them. One day, Archie stumbled upon a powerful artifact known as the "Orb of Dominance", which granted him magic powers but also corrupted him. Now known as the "Arch-Illager", he sought vengeance on all those who wronged him and subjugated numerous villages with his newly acquired army. Players assume the role of heroes who embark on a quest to defeat the Arch-Illager while liberating oppressed villages, fighting monsters, and completing various quests. Ultimately, the players face the Arch-Illager in his castle and destroy the Orb of Dominance, freeing Archie from its influence. Rather than punish Archie for his actions, the players show him kindness and forgiveness and quickly befriend him. As the players and Archie depart, the Orb is shown to be rebuilding itself. It is then found by an Enderman who picks up the orb and goes into the End. The last scene in the cutscene shows the mutant Enderman climbing out of the portal. In the game, after defeating Archie, players unlock new difficulties that make the game more challenging but provide better rewards.

Downloadable content 
There are six expansion packs that continue the story of the game:

 In Jungle Awakens, the players travel to a jungle that has been corrupted by a shard of the Orb of Dominance, turning its inhabitants into violent monsters. At the end of the expansion, the players face a boss, the "Jungle Abomination", before destroying the Orb shard and liberating the jungle of its corruption.
 In Creeping Winter, the location is changed to an island trapped in an eternal winter and the final boss is the "Wretched Wraith", but the premise remains the same.
 In Howling Peaks, the location is the windswept peaks of a mountain and the final boss is the "Tempest Golem".
 Flames of the Nether, set in the Nether, is the only expansion to feature no story elements.
 Hidden Depths returns to the premise of the first three expansions, and has players travel to the murky bottom of a deep ocean corrupted by an Orb shard. The final boss is the "Ancient Guardian".
 Echoing Void is the conclusion of the Orb of Dominance storyline, and sees the players traveling to the End to destroy the final shard, facing various monsters along the way, with the "Vengeful Heart of Ender" as the final boss.

Development
Dungeons is developed by Mojang Studios for Xbox One, Windows 10, PlayStation 4, and Nintendo Switch using Unreal Engine 4. Console ports are being done by Double Eleven.

With the continued success of the original Minecraft, Mojang thought about other possible games that could bring something new to the Minecraft universe. Experimenting with different ideas, the game was originally meant to be a single-player dungeon crawl game, inspired by The Legend of Zelda series, for the Nintendo 3DS. However, as the game began to take shape, these elements were changed or removed. For example, after adding in multiplayer features, the development team realized that these changes made the game more fun. According to game director Måns Olsen, the game was inspired by Diablo and Torchlight, as well as co-operative first-person shooter games like Warhammer: End Times – Vermintide and Left 4 Dead.

One of the primary challenges the development team faced was figuring out how to adapt the gameplay of dungeon crawl games like Diablo into the world of Minecraft. Since Minecraft characters did not have any special innate abilities, Mojang had to think of alternatives to things such as character class that would normally be found in games of that genre. Their solution was to focus on creating weapons and armor that the player could make more powerful through enchantments, allowing the player to explore their creativity through customization.

In addition, Mojang wanted to streamline the traditional dungeon crawl game experience into something more accessible. Olsen remarked that other games in the genre "are approachable to some degree, but they're typically games with very deep, interconnected systems", and that they wanted to make getting into Minecraft Dungeons "super easy" yet "instantly familiar". The decision to not allow building or crafting, a staple of the original Minecraft, was also made in order to focus on the core dungeon-crawling experience. To give more experienced players a challenge, the team added options to change the game's difficulty, which would reward players with better equipment and new secret content for playing on harder difficulties.

Minecraft Dungeons was first announced on September 28, 2018, during the Minecon live streaming event. A video showcasing gameplay was released during E3 2019.

Release 
Minecraft Dungeons was released on May 26, 2020, after being delayed from its original April release date due to the COVID-19 pandemic. The closed beta for the game ran for a month from March 25 to April 24, 2020.

After the initial release, the game was supported with several downloadable content (DLC) expansions packs that each added new dungeons, weapons, items and artifacts. The first expansion, titled Jungle Awakens, was released on July 1, 2020. It was followed by Creeping Winter on September 8, 2020, Howling Peaks on December 9, 2020, Flames of the Nether on February 24, 2021, Hidden Depths on May 26, 2021, and Echoing Void on July 28, 2021. An Xbox Series X/S-optimized version was released alongside the Flames of the Nether update. On July 28, 2021, the same day that Minecraft Dungeons: Echoing Void was released, Minecraft Dungeons, Ultimate Edition was released with all 6 DLCs and access to all Hero Pass Cosmetics.

In March 2021, Mojang announced an arcade version of the game associated with collectible cards. Officially licensed from Mojang and Microsoft, it was created by developer Play Mechanix and entertainment company Raw Thrills. The gameplay was changed into a beat-em-up format, similar to games such as Golden Axe. It debuted at Dave & Buster's restaurants sometime in May 2022.

Reception

Minecraft Dungeons received mixed to positive reviews from critics, according to review aggregator Metacritic. Critics generally found the game fun and charming, complimenting its visuals and music. Some were divided on Dungeons simplicity and the procedural generation system used to generate loot and dungeon layouts. Most reviewers were critical of the game's short story mode and perceived lack of depth. Shacknews called it "a fun, laid back dungeon crawler for friends to get into." The Hero Edition of Minecraft Dungeons sold 11,450 physical copies on the Nintendo Switch within its first week on sale in Japan, making it the fourth bestselling retail game of the week in the country. The game was nominated for the category of Best Family game at The Game Awards 2020. The game has over 15 million players, as of February 2022.

In other media 
Three music tracks from this game, Halland, Dalarna, and The Arch-Illager, are featured as downloadable content in the 2018 crossover fighting game Super Smash Bros. Ultimate, with the former two being rearranged into a single medley. These songs were added to the game on October 13, 2020, as part of Challenger Pack 7, which features content from Minecraft franchise including the default skins Steve and Alex as playable fighters and a stage based on Minecraft biomes.

References

External links

2020 video games
Action role-playing video games
Arcade games
Double Eleven (company) games
Dungeon crawler video games
Hack and slash role-playing games
Microsoft games
Minecraft
Nintendo Switch games
PlayStation 4 games
Unreal Engine games
Video games developed in Sweden
Video games developed in the United Kingdom
Video games set in castles
Video games using procedural generation
Video games postponed due to the COVID-19 pandemic
Video games with downloadable content
Video games with isometric graphics
Windows games
Xbox Cloud Gaming games
Xbox One games
Xbox Series X and Series S games
Multiplayer and single-player video games
Raw Thrills games